Kitrinoviricota is a phylum of RNA viruses that includes all positive-strand RNA viruses that infect eukaryotes and are not members of the phylum Pisuviricota or Lenarviricota. The name of the group derives from Greek κίτρινος (kítrinos), which means yellow (a reference to yellow fever virus), and -viricota, which is the suffix for a virus phylum.

Classes

The following classes are recognized:

 Alsuviricetes
 Flasuviricetes
 Magsaviricetes
 Tolucaviricetes

References

Viruses